The 2014 Swedish Golf Tour, titled as the 2014 Nordea Tour for sponsorship reasons, was the 31st season of the Swedish Golf Tour.

Most of the tournaments also featured on the 2014 Nordic Golf League.

Schedule
The following table lists official events during the 2014 season.

Order of Merit
The Order of Merit was titled as the Nordea Tour Ranking and was based on prize money won during the season, calculated using a points-based system.

See also
2014 Danish Golf Tour
2014 Swedish Golf Tour (women)

Notes

References

Swedish Golf Tour
Swedish Golf Tour